Costel Câmpeanu (born 14 May 1965 in Bacău) is a former Romanian football player, currently being a football coach. He was nicknamed Burebista, after the first king of Dacia because of his longevity in the Romanian first league in which he played 470 games.

Honours

Player
Dinamo București
Divizia A: 1989–90, 1991–92
Cupa României: 1989–90
Gloria Bistriţa
Cupa României runner-up: 1995–96
Supercupa României runner-up: 1994

References

External links

1965 births
Living people
Association football goalkeepers
Sportspeople from Bacău
Romanian footballers
Liga I players
FC Dinamo București players
CSM Ceahlăul Piatra Neamț players
ACF Gloria Bistrița players
FCM Bacău players
FC Progresul București players
Romanian football managers
CS Aerostar Bacău managers